The Democricetodontinae are a subfamily of fossil rodents from Miocene epoch.

The Democricetodontini were named as a paraphyletic taxon within the Cricetidae by Lindsay in 1987. It was reranked as a subfamily by Theocharopoulos in 2000.

See also

 Fauna of Africa

References

Cricetidae
Mammal subfamilies
Extinct rodents